Christian Gomis (born 25 August 1998) is a Senegalese professional footballer who plays as a centre-back for Hungarian First League club Budapest Honvéd.

He has previously played for Pacy Ménilles, ASD Cordenons, ÉF Bastia and Paris Saint-Germain B.

References

External links
 

1998 births
Living people
Footballers from Dakar
Senegalese footballers
French footballers
Senegalese emigrants to France
Association football defenders
French sportspeople of Senegalese descent
Championnat National 3 players
First Professional Football League (Bulgaria) players
PFC Lokomotiv Plovdiv players
Senegalese expatriate footballers
French expatriate footballers
Senegalese expatriate sportspeople in Italy
French expatriate sportspeople in Italy
Expatriate footballers in Italy
Senegalese expatriate sportspeople in Bulgaria
French expatriate sportspeople in Bulgaria
Expatriate footballers in Bulgaria